Andrea Douglas Story (born April 2, 1959) is a Democratic member of the Alaska Legislature representing the State's 34th House district.

Career
Story won the election for her House seat on November 6, 2018, as the candidate of the Democratic Party. She secured fifty-three percent of the vote while Republican Jerry Nankervis secured forty-seven percent.

References

1959 births
21st-century American women politicians
21st-century American politicians
Living people
Story, Andi
People from Juneau, Alaska
Women state legislators in Alaska
People from Olivia, Minnesota